Louisiana Highway 445 (LA 445) is a state highway in Louisiana that serves Tangipahoa Parish.   It spans  in a south to north direction.  Near its north end, it is known as Husser Road.

Route description
 
From the south, LA 445 begins near Lee's Landing.  It heads north, intersects LA 22 and turns eastward to follow it for about a half-mile before turning back north.  The highway heads toward the community of Robert, crossing Sims Creek and then intersecting (overpassing) I-12 at a folded-diamond interchange (Exit 47). At Robert, LA 445 and US 190 cross at a traffic signal.  Continuing northward, LA 445 meets LA 40 (which it overlaps for about one mile) near Uneedus and passes along the eastern boundary of the Zemurray Gardens Lodge Complex.  After a northwestward jog, LA 445 meets LA 1062 near Husser.  At that point, the road turns back northward (becoming Husser Road) until it ends at LA 16 east of Amite.

LA 445 is an undivided, two-lane highway for its entire length with exception of the on-off ramps, left turn lanes, and traffic islands at the I-12 interchange and at certain other intersections.

Major intersections

References

External links

LADOTD Map of Numbered Highways
Louisiana State Highway Log

0445
Transportation in Tangipahoa Parish, Louisiana